Cryptarchinae is a subfamily of sap-feeding beetles in the family Nitidulidae. There are at least 3 genera and about 17 described species in Cryptarchinae.

Genera
These three genera belong to the subfamily Cryptarchinae:
 Cryptarcha Shuckard, 1839 i c g b
 Glischrochilus Reitter, 1873 i c g b
 Pityophagus Shuckard, 1839 i c g b
Data sources: i = ITIS, c = Catalogue of Life, g = GBIF, b = Bugguide.net

References

Further reading

External links

 

Nitidulidae